Freeman Glacier is a channel glacier flowing to the west side of Perry Bay, Antarctica, immediately east of Freeman Point. It was delineated from air photos taken by U.S. Navy Operation Highjump (1946–47), and was named by the Advisory Committee on Antarctic Names for J.D. Freeman, sailmaker on the sloop Peacock of the United States Exploring Expedition (1838–42) under Charles Wilkes.

See also
 List of glaciers in the Antarctic
 Glaciology

References

 

Glaciers of Wilkes Land